The Church of Saint George is a 13th-century Armenian Apostolic church in Haftvan, Salmas County, West Azerbaijan Province, Iran. It was renovated in 1652 and also after 1930 Salmas earthquake. There is a half-ruined auditorium nearby which was built in early 20th century.

References

See also 
 List of Armenian churches in Iran

Armenian Apostolic churches in Iran
Churches in Iran
Buildings and structures in West Azerbaijan Province